Midnight Sun is the fifth EP and the sixth overall by South Korean boy band Beast. It was released on July 22, 2012, with "Beautiful Night" as the promotional track. "Midnight" was released one week before the EP's release, on July 15, 2012.

Background
On May 16, 2012, Beast's South Korean comeback was hinted at in tweets to the B2UTYs (Beast fan club) by Cube Entertainment CEO Hong Seong-sung. According to Hong, "All you B2UTYs, we are planning on making the greatest comeback ever known".

On July 3, Beast was seen in a week-long music-video shoot in New York City (from July 1 until July 7). It was the group's first music video filmed outside South Korea. Beast announced their comeback in South Korea on July 11 on Google+, saying that their new EP would be released on July 22. That day, a photo of the EP's title and release date was posted on the band's Korean website. The following day (July 12), Cube Entertainment announced that "Midnight" would be released on July 15. On July 13, photos were posted on Cube Entertainment's Facebook page. The following day, a preview of the music video for "Beautiful Night" was released. On July 15, "Midnight" and its video were released digitally on South Korea music sites. Two days later, Cube Entertainment introduced "Beautiful Night" and posted two photos of Doo-joon, Jun-hyung and Dong-woon. On July 18, two more photos of Hyun-seung, Yo-seob and Gi-kwang were posted. The following day, the EP's track list and composers were announced. On July 20, a preview of the music video for "Beautiful Night" was released on Beast's YouTube channel. Two days later, the EP and the "Beautiful Night" video were released.

Composition
Most of the EP's six songs were written by Yong Jun-hyung; "Beautiful Night" was written by 4realz, Goodnite and Sleepwell, the first time Beast did not use a song produced by Shinsadong Tiger as its lead single. "Midnight" was written by Yong Jun-hyung, Choi Kyu-sung and Shinsadong Tiger, and "Not Me" was written by Rado and Jun-hyung. "When I Miss You" was written by Jun-hyung and Choi Kyu-sung, and "The Day You Rest" and "Dream Girl" were written by Jun-hyung and Kim Tae-joo. A Japanese version of "Midnight" was scheduled for release as the group's third Japanese single.

Release
A limited edition of the EP was released on August 8, 2012 with the CD, an 84-page photo booklet, a wallet card, 12 photo cards, a 3D card, a golden card with serial code and a mobile-phone cleaner. A Japanese edition was released on September 26 in two editions, with "I Knew It" (released as a digital single in South Korea) included on the track list; one edition had a DVD with the EP's music videos.

Promotions
Beast performed "Beautiful Night" on July 27, 2012 on KBS's Music Bank. The song was also promoted on Music Core, Inkigayo and M! Countdown. "Not Me" was used for the comeback-week performances. On Inkigayo, the group used their performance of "Beautiful Night" in the guerilla concert at Gwanghwamun Square.

Track listing

Chart performance

Album chart

Singles chart

Other songs charted

Sales and certifications

Release history

References

External links
 
 
 
 

2012 EPs
Highlight (band) EPs
Cube Entertainment EPs
Dance-pop EPs
Korean-language EPs